Debra Lynn Messing (born August 15, 1968) is an American actress. After graduating from New York University's Tisch School of the Arts, Messing appeared in several television series, including Ned and Stacey on Fox (1995–1997) and Prey on ABC (1998). She achieved her breakthrough role as Grace Adler, an interior designer, on the NBC sitcom Will & Grace (1998–2006, 2017–2020), for which she received seven Golden Globe Award nominations and five Primetime Emmy Award nominations for Outstanding Lead Actress in a Comedy Series, winning once, in 2003.

From 2007 to 2008, Messing starred as Molly Kagan, the ex-wife of a Hollywood film mogul, on the television miniseries The Starter Wife, for which she received two Golden Globe nominations, a Primetime Emmy Award nomination, and a Screen Actors Guild Award nomination. Thereafter, she appeared as Broadway playwright Julia Houston on the NBC musical drama Smash (2012–2013) and as homicide detective Laura Diamond on the NBC police-procedural comedy The Mysteries of Laura (2014–2016). From 2017 to 2020, Messing reprised her role as Grace Adler on NBC's three season revival of Will & Grace, garnering a ninth Golden Globe nomination for her performance.

Messing's film work includes A Walk in the Clouds (1995), Jesus (1999), The Mothman Prophecies (2002), Hollywood Ending (2002), Along Came Polly (2004), The Wedding Date (2005), Lucky You (2007), The Women (2008), Nothing Like the Holidays (2008), Searching (2018), and 13: The Musical (2022). She has also lent her voice to animated films such as Garfield (2004) and Open Season (2006).

Early life
Messing was born in Brooklyn, New York, the daughter of Sandra (née Simons), who worked as a professional singer, banker, and travel and real estate agent, and Brian Messing, a sales executive for a costume jewelry packaging manufacturer. Messing is Jewish and had a Bat Mitzvah ceremony; her Jewish ancestors emigrated from Poland and Russia. When Messing was three, she moved with her parents and her older brother, Brett, to East Greenwich, Rhode Island.

During her high school years, she acted and sang in a number of high school productions at East Greenwich High School, including the starring roles in the musicals Annie and Grease. She took lessons in dance, singing, and acting. In 1986, she was Rhode Island's Junior Miss and competed in Mobile, Alabama, in the America's Junior Miss scholarship program.

While Messing's parents encouraged her dream of becoming an actress, they also urged her to complete a liberal arts education before deciding on acting as a career. Following their advice, she attended Brandeis University, where, at her parents' request, three-quarters of her courses were not theater-related. During her junior year, she studied theater at the prestigious British European Studies Group of London (BESGL) program, an experience that solidified her desire to act.

In 1990, after graduating summa cum laude from Brandeis with a Bachelor of Arts in Theater Arts, Messing gained admission to the elite Grad Acting Program at New York University's Tisch School of the Arts, which accepts 16 new students annually. She earned a Master of Fine Arts after three years.

Career
In 1993, Messing won acclaim for her performance as Harper in the pre-Broadway workshop production of Tony Kushner's play Angels in America: Perestroika. Subsequently, she appeared in several episodes of the television series NYPD Blue during 1994 and 1995.

In 1995, Messing made her film debut in Alfonso Arau's A Walk in the Clouds playing the unfaithful wife of main character Paul Sutton (Keanu Reeves). This exposure led Fox to make her the co-star of the television sitcom Ned & Stacey. The series lasted for two seasons, from 1995 to 1997. Messing appeared as Jerry Seinfeld's romantic interest in two episodes of the series Seinfeld: "The Wait Out" in 1996 and "The Yada Yada" in 1997. Messing turned down a starring role in another television sitcom to appear in Donald Margulies's two-character play Collected Stories, which opened at the off-Broadway Manhattan Theatre Club. She also co-starred in the Tom Arnold vehicle McHale's Navy in 1997.

In 1998, Messing played a lead role as the bioanthropologist Sloan Parker on ABC's dramatic science-fiction television series Prey. During this time, her agent approached her with the pilot script for the television show Will & Grace. Messing was inclined to take some time off, but the script intrigued her, and she auditioned for the role of Grace Adler, beating Nicollette Sheridan, who later guest-starred on the show as Grace's romantic rival. Will & Grace became a ratings success, and Messing received critical acclaim for her performance.

In 2002, she was named one of the "50 Most Beautiful People in the World" by People. TV Guide picked her as its "Best Dressed Woman" in 2003. And Messing's trademark curls on Will & Grace won her five Crown Awards from voters at the celebrity hair site Super-Hair.Net between 2000 and 2008.

Director Woody Allen cast Messing in a supporting role in his film Hollywood Ending (2002). Her film roles since include Richard Gere's ill-fated wife in the supernatural thriller The Mothman Prophecies (2002) and a supporting role as an unfaithful bride in Along Came Polly (2004). The Wedding Date (2005) was Messing's first leading role in a high-profile film. It received mixed reviews but performed fairly well at the box office.

Messing was featured as a judge on the season finale of the second season of Bravo's reality show Project Runway. Also in 2005, along with Megan Mullally, she was awarded the Women in Film Lucy Award in recognition of her excellence and innovation in her creative works that have enhanced the perception of women through the medium of television.

She also starred in the television miniseries The Starter Wife (2007), which was nominated for ten Emmy Awards, including one for Messing for Outstanding Lead Actress in a Miniseries or Movie. In 2008, Messing reprised her role as Molly Kagan in the television series The Starter Wife, consisting of 10 episodes. In early 2010, Messing starred in the ABC comedy pilot Wright vs. Wrong for the 2010–2011 primetime season, but ABC did not pick-up the pilot.

In July 2011, Messing was ranked no. 22 on the TV Guide Network special, Funniest Women on TV. In February 2011, producers announced that Messing would star in a new NBC musical pilot called Smash for the 2011–2012 primetime season. In May 2011, it was reported that NBC picked up the show as a series for the 2011–2012 season. The show premiered on February 6, 2012. The show was later renewed for a second season after which it was cancelled.

Messing appeared with Green Day singer Billie Joe Armstrong and Leighton Meester in Frank Whaley's drama film Like Sunday, Like Rain in 2014. For her performance, Messing won the 2014 Best Actress Award at The Williamsburg Independent Film Festival.

She made her Broadway debut in John Patrick Shanley's play Outside Mullingar alongside Tony Award winner Brían F. O'Byrne, which began previews at the Samuel J. Friedman Theatre on January 3, 2014. Outside Mullingar was nominated for Best Play for the 2014 (68th Annual) Tony Awards.

Messing starred in The Mysteries of Laura, a police procedural television show that premiered in September 2014. The series lasted for two seasons and ended in 2016.

Messing portrayed Marjorie Houseman in the television remake of the film Dirty Dancing (1987). It aired on ABC in May 2017.

She starred again as Grace Adler in the revival of Will & Grace on NBC. The revival aired for three seasons, from September 2017 to April 2020.

Personal life
Messing met Daniel Zelman, an actor and screenwriter, on their first day as graduate students at New York University in 1990. They were married on September 3, 2000, and lived in Manhattan. On April 7, 2004, Messing gave birth to their son, Roman. In December 2011, she and her husband separated after 11 years of marriage. Messing filed for divorce on June 5, 2012, and the divorce became official on March 1, 2016. Messing dated her Smash co-star Will Chase from the end of 2011 to October 2014.

In 2012, she posed nude for the May issue of Allure magazine.

Politically, Messing supports the Democratic Party.

Filmography

Film

Television

Awards and nominations
Messing's most honored role is as Grace Adler on Will & Grace, which earned her seven Golden Globe Award nominations for Best Lead Actress in a Television Series – Comedy or Musical; five Primetime Emmy Award nominations for Outstanding Lead Actress in a Comedy Series, one of which she won in 2003; and seven Screen Actors Guild Award nominations: two for Outstanding Performance by a Female Actor in a Comedy Series and five for Outstanding Performance by an Ensemble in a Comedy Series – winning one in 2001.

Honors 

 2005: Nominated for Favorite Funny Female Star by the People's Choice Awards.
 2005: Honored with the Lucy Award, by the Women in Film Crystal + Lucy Awards – to recognize women and men and their creative works that have enhanced the perception of women through the medium of television.
 2017: Honored with the Excellence in Media Award by the GLAAD (Gay & Lesbian Alliance Against Defamation) – to individuals in the media and entertainment industries who through their work have increased the visibility and understanding of the LGBT (lesbian, gay, bisexual and transgender) community.
 2017, October 6: Inducted into the Hollywood Walk of Fame and received a star for her contribution to Television – located at 6201 Hollywood Blvd.

Accolades

References

External links 

 
 Debra Messing Video produced by Makers: Women Who Make America
 
 
 

1968 births
Living people
Actresses from Rhode Island
American film actresses
American people of Polish-Jewish descent
American people of Russian-Jewish descent
American stage actresses
American television actresses
American voice actresses
Brandeis University alumni
Jewish American actresses
New York (state) Democrats
Outstanding Performance by a Lead Actress in a Comedy Series Primetime Emmy Award winners
People from East Greenwich, Rhode Island
Tisch School of the Arts alumni
20th-century American actresses
21st-century American actresses